The Titan EP is an EP by the metalcore band Oh, Sleeper. It was released in 2013 independently after a successful crowd-funding effort on the website Indiegogo.

Background and concept
The Titan EP was released independently by Oh, Sleeper with funding assistance via Indiegogo.

This new concept is about a campaign (Titan) that is taking over the world, town by town, offering synthetic upgrades (mechanical hearts, eyes, lungs, limbs) in exchange for time served in their service. Every upgrade costs a time commitment (contract) where you must do the bidding of Titan.

The idea is that anything is possible: if one wants to be a doctor and do not want to work for it, one can have a skill download from Titan with a brain augmentation and have it instantly. The only cost is that one is now a part of Titan until the time-debt has been paid. If one wants to be a marathon runner, have new legs, etc. The catch is that these upgrades need servicing and the only people who can service them are the Titan technicians, the only currencies accepted are time-contracts. The older one is, the less time one has to spend. If one has a debt when they die, it transfers to the next of kin.

Song descriptions
"Naofumi Mitsuhashi" is the first song on the EP. The song is the name given by the user who donated the largest single donation on Oh, Sleeper's Indiegogo campaign. It bears no relation to EP's transhumanist concept.

"The Pitch" is the second song, in which a boy age 16 who dreams of being a pilot but cannot under normal circumstances due to him being born blind, is "pitched" the sale of bodily augmentation to achieve his dream. In return, as payment he must agree to a 6 years "time contract" for the services rendered. In this case he will receive a new set of eyes and in return he must spend his time doing whatever the group asks of him using his augmentations. Driven by his desire, he accepts the eyes but not until after some persuasion by the group. At the end of the song he is convinced.

In the third song, "Death From Above", the boy awakens with his new eyes and is given the option to join the piloting program offered by the Titan group. He spends his 6-year contract being a pilot doing the Titan's tasks appointed to him. He is ecstatic about his new life and is learning from the program. At the end of his 6 years he is promoted to the "collectors program". He is now responsible for finding augmentees fleeing from their time debts. He is tasked with a dangerous raid on a rogue hideout.

"Heavy Hands" is the fourth song. During the raid on the rogue hideout, the boy's eyes malfunction and he is captured and tortured by the rogue augmentees. They beat him for information but he does not talk. The rogues send him back to Titan as a message. On his way to the drop point one of the augmentees asks him, "What would happen if nobody resisted the Titan?" Beaten within an inch of his life, Titan does another operation giving him a new heart and another 18 years to his Titan debt. That night the augmentee's words ring through his head and he begins to doubt and regret the Titan program.

In the fifth song, "The Rise", he is awakened by explosions and sirens as the facility is being attacked by the rogue augmentees. He is commanded to secure the breach. As he approaches he sees a truck fleeing and in the back is the rogue who left him with those echoing words. He spots a motorcycle and all of his being is telling him to get on it and flee. He follows the truck and after a long chase the trucks veers off the road immediately following a loud screech and flash of light. His eyes go black and he crashes. He awakens in a cell. Still blind he hears the rogue ask him why he followed. He answers and says that a Titan debt was never meant to be repaid. The rogue responds by asking if he is ready to join their cause. He quickly replies that he will do anything he can to bring an end to Titan. The rogue responds by saying that he could never stand by their side, even though his mind and spirit is willing, his eyes will always be loyal to Titan. The rogue leaves and drops a metal object on the ground. His eyes power back on and all he sees is a flag with a pentagram-like symbol being held by a scorpion and a knife on the ground. He grabs the knife and with a firm grip carves out his eyes, sending an unmistakable message of resistance to Titan.

Track listing

Personnel
Micah Kinard - lead vocals
Shane Blay - lead guitar, clean vocals
Zac Mayfield - drums
Nathan Grady - rhythm guitar, bass 
 Produced by Oh, Sleeper and Andreas Lars Magnusson
 Engineered, mixed and mastered by Andreas Lars Magnusson, at Planet Red Studios, Richmond, Virginia
 Artwork by Pavlov Visuals
 Guest appearances:
 Guest vocals on "The Pitch" performed by Casey Sabol
 Guest guitar solo on "Death From Above" performed by Jacky Vincent

References

External links 
[ Billboard.com]

2013 EPs
Oh, Sleeper albums